The Surfer Joe Summer Festival is an annual music event currently held in Livorno, Italy, dedicated to surf music and organized by Surfer Joe Music. Due to the popularity gained throughout the years within the surf music scene and the international attendance, the organization titled it "The World's Number 1 Surf Music Event". It usually features surf bands from all over the world that have recently been under the spotlight of the surf music community, legends of the genre or even relatively new bands looking for popularity. It does not only features concerts but also symposiums, cultural happenings, artists meet & greets, exhibitions and other activities related to the music genre or reminding to the "California 60s style". It has also been connected to surfing, surf brands and lately it has got closer to the tiki scene.

"Today, surf instrumental bands are all over the planet. There is a sizeable core audience that grows every year. Several websites are devoted to this music, and large surf music festivals are held annually in places such as Orange County (SG101 Convention), Italy (Surfer Joe Summer Fest) [...]. You do not have to search very far to find surf music these days".

History 

The festival was born from an idea of Lorenzo Valdambrini (aka Surfer Joe) who organized it independently for the first two editions in 2003 and 2004. After 4 years of break, Lorenzo's brother Luca Valdambrini strongly pushed for relaunching the event and legally forming the Cultural Association Surfer Joe Music. Since then, the Surfer Joe Summer Festival is organized and managed by the Valdambrini brothers with the logistic and technical support of many collaborators including Francesco Tonarini, partner with the Surfer Joe Cafe & Diner business.

"In spring 2002, Valdambrini created the web site surferjoemusic.com to promote the Italian Surf Music scene. Then in winter of 2003 he began producing shows featuring bands playing Surf Music at several venues in Italy, followed by a series of Surfin' Sundays events that paired Italian and International bands. The summer was rounded out with the first Summer Festival of Surf Music, held on the beach of Marina di Massa, a small town north of Pisa"

"Ten years later, surf music attained a new measure of respect abroad when an Italian enthusiast named Lorenzo Valdambrini established an annual international festival. Named after the Surfaris song, the Surfer Joe Summer Festival has for nearly a decade celebrated California's first modern indigenous folk music..."

Editions

2003
Location: Beat Cafe', Poveromo, Massa

Bands: Bambi Molesters - Braccobaldos - Bradipos IV - Cosmogringos - Cosmonauti - Crashmen - Fantomatici - Faraons - Hangee V - Link Pretara & The Rudimentals - Los Rebaldos - Pipelines - Ray Daytona & Googoobombos - Revelaires - Slacktone - Tarantulas - Urania

2004
Location: Green Park, Calcinaia, Pisa

Bands: Astrophonix - Bahareebas - Bitch Boys - Los Venturas - Slacktone - Speedsurfers - Sunny Boys - Surfin' Lungs - Wet-Tones

2008 
Location: Precisamente a Calafuria, Livorno

Bands: Ambasciatori dell'Amore - Barbwires - Bitch Boys - Charades - Crashmen - Favolosi Traslatori - Jaguar & Savanas - Rifflessi - Sexual Chocolate - Sunny Boys - Surfadelics - Surfoniani - Vibrants - Wadadli Riders & Daddy-O Grande - Wavers - Wet-Tones

2009 
Location: Precisamente a Calafuria, Livorno

Bands: Bradipos IV - Cowabunga Go-Go - Docteur Legume Et Les Surfwerks - Ex Presidenti - Fantomatici - Hangee V - Hot Rod Surfers - Jumpin' Quails - Kilaueas - Les Arondes - Los Coronas - Madeira - Pipelines - Pollo Del Mar - Psycho Surfers - Rev Hank from Urban Surf Kings - Rodeo Clowns - Shuffles - Twang Marvels - Wadadli Riders

2010 
Location: Otto e Mezzo Studios, Livorno

Bands: Ambasciatori Dell'amore - Astrophonix - El Ray - Los Straitjackets - King Kongs - Los Blue Marinos - Los Kahunas - Mule Skinners - Reverberati - Sinfonico Honolulu - Slacktone - Sunmakers - Surfadelics - Surfin' Lungs - Surfoniani - Razorblades - Wet-Tones - Twang Marvels - Wadadli Riders

2011
Location: Fortezza Vecchia Livorno, Livorno

Bands: Anacondas - Ava Kant - Bambi Molesters - Bradipos IV - Crashmen - Docteur Legume Et Les Surfwerks - John Blair Band - Kilaueas - Krontjong Devils - Los Derrumbes - Los Fantasticos - Phantom Four - Pocaonda - Psycho Surfers - Space Rangers - Sunny Boys - Surfer Joe & His Boss Combo - Wavers

2012
Location: Surfer Joe Cafe & Diner, Livorno

Bands: Bang! Mustang! - Cannibal Mosquitos - Dirty Fuse - Frankie & The Poolboys - Jaguar & The Savanas - Kilaueas - Les Chefs - Los Lagoonas - Los Venturas - Lunatones - Meshugga Beach Party - Messer Chups - Ray Daytona & Googoobombos - Surfadelics - Tomorrowmen - Tonomats

2013
Location: Surfer Joe Cafe & Diner, Livorno

Bands: Alwaro Negro - Apemen - Atlantics - Dave & The Pussies - Diabolico Coupe - Five Fingers With Parasol - Insect Surfers - Les Agamemnonz - Los Lagoonas - Surfoniani - Mullet Monster Mafia - Psycho Surfers - Spaceguards - Speedball Jr - Surfer Joe & His Boss Combo - Tonomats - Tony Dynamite & The Shootin' Beavers - Ukulelics

2014
Location: Surfer Joe Cafe & Diner, Livorno

Bands: Bang! Mustang! - Bradipos IV - El Ray - Fifty Foot Combo - Monokini - Paul Johnson - Phantom Four - Pyronauts - Razorblades - Slacktone - Surfites - Threesome - Tony Dynamite - Watang!

2015
Location: Surfer Joe Cafe & Diner, Livorno

Bands: A-Phonics - Aqua Barons - Bambi Molesters - Biarritz Boys - Boss Martians - Daikaiju - Dead Rocks - Five Fingers With Parasol - John Blair & Ivan Pongracic Band - Kilaueas - Los Coronas - Lost Acapulco - Messer Chups - Pirato Ketchup - Satan's Pilgrims - Sine Waves - Surfer Joe - Surflamingo - Taikonauts - Terrorist Bengala Party - Tremolo Beer Gut - Urban Surf Kings - West Samoa Surfer League

2016
Location: Surfer Joe Cafe & Diner, Livorno

Bands: Aloha Sluts - Bad Riders - Bang! Mustang! - Barbwires - Boss Fink - Bradipos IV - Charades - Demon Vendetta - El Caminos - Hell-O-Tiki - Les Agamemnonz - Longboards - Los Apollos - Los Banditos - Los Oxidados - Los Protones - Los Venturas - M74 - Mullet Monster Mafia - Psycho Surfers - Razorblades - Shar-Keys - Stingrays - Stories From Shamehill - Surf Coasters - Surfin' Boars - Twin Tones - Volcanics - Watang!

2017
Location: Surfer Joe Cafe & Diner, Livorno

Bands: 5.6.7.8's - Akulas - Arno De Cea & The Clockwork Wizards - Bamboogie Injections - Black Flamingos - El Ray - Hicadoolas - Huntington Cads - Illuminators - Insect Surfers - Jason Lee & The R.I.P. Tides - Kingargoolas - Link Protrudi & The Jaymen - Los Banditos - Los Drigos - Los Fantasticos - Los Freneticos - Orgaphonics - Randy Holden - Surfer Joe - Surfin' Lungs - Tomorrowmen

2018
Location: Surfer Joe Cafe & Diner, Livorno

Bands: Balu und Die Surfgrammeln - Daikaiju - Dave & The Pussies - Fascinating Creatures Of The Deep - Fat Tones - Frankie & The Poolboys - Krontjong Devils - Los Blue Marinos - Lulufin The Woo Hoo - Messer Chups - Molokai Cocktail - Monokini - Necronautics - Operation Octopus - Phantom Four - Reverbly Ones - Seasick Surfers - Space Cossacks - Stronzo Gelantino & The Boo-Men - Surfer Joe & The Bradipos IV - Tikiyaki 5-0 - Typhoons - Wave Chargers

2019
Location: Surfer Joe Cafe & Diner, Livorno

Bands: Atollo 13 - Atomic Mosquitos - Bradipos IV - Del-Toros - Dirty Fuse - Dome La Muerte E.X.P. - El Zeb - Fat Tones - Ghiblis - Guantanamos - Hicadoolas - Insect Surfers - Kilaueas - Killers From Space - Les Agamemnonz - Locals - Los Coguaros - Molokai Cocktail - Moms I'd Like To Surf - Mullet Monster Mafia - Par Avion - Phantom Dragsters - Requel - Rps Surfers - Sonoras - Surfer Joe - Surfoniani - Topdrop - Trabants - Tremolo Beer Gut

References

External links 

 Official web site
 SurferJoeMusic.com
 SurferJoe.it
 Lorenzo Valdambrini (Surfer Joe) official web site

Rock festivals in Italy